Blue Bloods is an American police procedural drama television series that has been airing on CBS since September 2010. Its main characters are members of the fictional Reagan family, a Catholic, Irish-American  family in New York City with a history of work in law enforcement. Blue Bloods stars Tom Selleck as New York City Police Commissioner Frank Reagan; other main cast members include Donnie Wahlberg, Bridget Moynahan, Will Estes and Len Cariou for all 13 seasons, plus Amy Carlson (seasons 1–7), and Sami Gayle (seasons 1–11; played by Marlene Lawston in the pilot episode).

The show is filmed on location in New York City with references to suburban areas as well. The series debuted on September 24, 2010, with episodes airing on Fridays following CSI: NY before being moved to Wednesdays at 10:00 p.m. Eastern and Pacific time and 9:00 p.m. Central and Mountain time for a four-week tryout. After four weeks, it returned to its original Friday 10:00 p.m. Eastern time slot, where it has remained since. In May 2020, CBS renewed the series for an eleventh season, which premiered on December 4, 2020. In April 2021, CBS renewed the series for a twelfth season, which premiered on October 1, 2021. In April 2022, CBS renewed the series for a thirteenth season, which premiered on October 7, 2022.

Premise 
The series follows the Reagans, a family who has a history of work in law enforcement. Frank Reagan is the New York Police Department Police Commissioner. Frank's eldest son, Danny, is an NYPD Detective, his youngest son, Jamie, is an NYPD Sergeant, and his daughter, Erin, works as an Assistant District Attorney. Frank's second son, Joe (though the series mistakenly refers to him as the eldest in more recent episodes), was murdered by a corrupt cop in the line of duty in events that predate the series, when he was involved with an FBI investigation of a group of corrupt NYPD cops known as the Blue Templar. Frank's father, Henry, is a former NYPD beat cop who rose through the ranks to become Police Commissioner. The show's title references both the "blue blooded" concept of nobility as it relates to the Reagan family's powerful roles within New York City's criminal justice system as well as the American concept of an entire family who dedicate their lives to the law enforcement profession as one that "bleeds blue".

Each member of the family represents a different aspect of police work or the legal process: Frank as the commissioner, Danny as the detective, Jamie as the beat cop, and Erin as the prosecutor. Additionally, while each person's story might occasionally interweave with another's, the show also follows the professional and, at times, personal relationships with their respective partners and colleagues: Frank with Garrett Moore, the NYPD Deputy Commissioner of Public Information and de facto Chief of Staff, Detective 1st Grade Abigail Baker, the primary aide to the commissioner, and later, Lieutenant Sidney Gormley, the Special Assistant to the Commissioner and de facto Chief of Department; Danny with Detective Jackie Curatola and later, Detective Maria Baez; Jamie with Officer Edit "Eddie" Janko; and Erin with Detective Anthony Abetemarco, who is an investigator for the DA's office.

The Reagans are an Irish-American Catholic family that gathers for Sunday dinner each week.  According to People, "the Sunday supper is the heart of each show."

Both Henry's and Frank's respective wives, Betty and Mary, are deceased, as is Joe. Erin is divorced and has one daughter, college graduate Nicky, who lived with her mother until accepting a job in San Francisco in season 10. Danny is a widower with two sons, Jack and Sean. He was married to Linda, a nurse who was killed off-screen in a helicopter crash between seasons 7 and 8. Jamie married his partner, Edit "Eddie" Janko, in the season 9 finale. They acknowledged their mutual attraction during season 7 and became engaged at the end of season 8.

The season 10 finale revealed a 24-year-old son of Joe's that neither he nor the family knew about, a young detective in the firearms unit named Joe Hill (played by Will Hochman).

Cast and characters

Episodes

Production 

Selleck mentioned that he was drawn to the project because of the strong pilot script and that he was concerned about becoming involved in an ongoing series because he did not want to compromise his commitment to the Jesse Stone television movies. Beginning January 19, 2011, Blue Bloods was moved to Wednesdays at 10 p.m. for a four-week tryout. In February 2011, the series returned to its Friday night time slot due to the series premiere of Criminal Minds: Suspect Behavior.

In the United Kingdom, the show helped launch Sky Atlantic by premiering on Tuesday, February 1, 2011, at 10:30 p.m.  In Australia, the show premiered in February 2011 in a primetime Wednesday slot on Network Ten, then from February 2013 for season two was moved from the network's primary SD channel to its HD channel one alongside White Collar, then on August 26, 2013, the show moved back to the primary SD channel on Mondays for season three.  In New Zealand, the show premieres on July 13, 2013, on TV3 replacing CSI: NY in a primetime Saturday slot after Law & Order: Special Victims Unit.

On October 20, 2012, CBS announced that Jennifer Esposito was being dropped from the series, with her character, Detective Curatola, being placed on indefinite leave of absence. Esposito and CBS had been at odds over her limited availability for work after the actress was diagnosed with celiac disease. She had missed a week after collapsing on set earlier in the season. According to Esposito, CBS challenged her request for a reduced work schedule, and further, kept her from finding work elsewhere. In a press release from CBS, the network said that Esposito had "informed us that she is only available to work on a very limited part-time schedule. As a result, she's unable to perform the demands of her role and we regretfully had to put her character on a leave of absence." Curatola's last appearance was in the season three episode "Nightmares".

According to TV by the Numbers, by committing itself to a third season of Blue Bloods, CBS all but guaranteed a fourth season, because, as a CBS Television Studios production, CBS had a financial incentive to produce at least the minimum number of episodes needed for stripped syndication. On March 27, 2013, CBS made it official by renewing Blue Bloods for a fourth season to begin in the fall of 2013. As of 2022, the show has been renewed through season 13.

A house in Bay Ridge in Brooklyn is used for exterior shots of the Reagan home.

The series received $79 million in tax breaks from the state of New York for its seasons four through seven.

International Broadcast 
In Australia, the series premiered on Network Ten's primary channel on February 2, 2011. Due to poor ratings of the first season, Ten moved the series to its HD channel One, which premiered the second season on October 31, 2011. Due to decreased viewership of Ten's primary channel, season three moved back from August 26, 2013, and season four returned on March 17, 2014. Foxtel channel TV HITS (styled TV H!TS) have started airing the series from Episode 1, weeknights at 8:30pm AEST as of March 20.

In New Zealand, the series premiered on TV3 on July 13, 2013.

In the United Kingdom and Ireland, Sky Atlantic premiered the series on February 1, 2011, with season two returning on October 4, 2011, season three on December 13, 2012, and season four on November 28, 2013. Season five premiered on January 21, 2015.

From Season 9 Blue Bloods moved to Sky Witness and airs on Monday nights.

The series has also been broadcast throughout the Arabic-speaking market through MBC Action.

Every episode is available to stream on Paramount+.

Reruns 
Reruns of Blue Bloods air nationally in the United States on Wednesdays on Ion Television, although it was briefly removed from the schedule in early 2020, NewsNation, the latter of which airs the show daily, and starting with a marathon of episodes on July 4th, 2022 Up TV began airing the program with episodes every weeknight. CBS Media Ventures currently distributes the series to local outlets on weekends, with two episodes being offered. Repeats of Blue Bloods air on Pick in the United Kingdom. The show airs twice a day on TV 2 Charlie in Denmark.

Reception 

On Metacritic, the series has a weighted average score of 70 out of 100, based on reviews from 25 critics, indicating "generally favorable reviews."

Reviewers have praised the series' on-location shooting. The New York Daily News praised Selleck's performance as Frank Reagan, while also praising the family dinner scenes for discussion of morally complex issues.

The Daily News drew comparisons between Selleck's characters Jesse Stone and Frank Reagan, saying that both Reagan and Stone are moral, principled men of few words. In Entertainment Weeklys annual Fall TV Preview, Ken Tucker named Blue Bloods one of the "5 Best New Shows" of 2010.

In late 2014, the magazine Slates Laura Hudson criticized the show for its depiction of racial incidents involving the police.

In 2017, Selleck was nominated for a People's Choice Award for Favorite TV Crime Drama Actor for his work on the show.

In 2011, Michael Hann, writing for The Guardian, panned the show by calling it "predictable", "trite" and "pisspoor".

Ratings 
The pilot episode garnered 15.258 million viewers because of the Live + 7 days after with viewings from DVRs. Without the DVR adding to the live viewing the show's debut episode garnered a total of 13.02 million viewers.

Overall, the ratings have been steady for the series, after the pilot episode. The lowest viewer total through the first seven seasons was 8.88 million in episode eight of season seven (which ran against Game 3 of the 2016 World Series); it was one of the few episodes through the first seven seasons that had fewer than 9 million initial-broadcast viewers. The second-season finale on May 11, 2012, was watched by 10.73 million viewers and received a 1.2/4 ratings/share among adults ages 18–49. The highest (non-pilot) live viewership of 12.93 million occurred in episode 14 of season four ("Manhattan Queens"), which was the series' 81st episode.

In January 2013, CBS announced via press release that Blue Bloods was the first scripted Friday series in 10 years to average at least 13 million viewers (live + 7), gaining eight percent more viewers than the previous year. The second season of CSI in 2001 had 14.78 million viewers, while the fourth season of Law & Order: SVU in 2003 had 14.92 million.

From season 8 onward, ratings have declined. Season 9 was the first season with no episodes reaching 10 million first-run viewers, although Blue Bloods still ranked as the eighth most watched program in 2018–19 Live + 7 viewership. Season 9 also saw the lowest first-run viewership for any episode to date (7.62 million for Ep. 14, "My Brother's Keeper").

References

External links 

 
 

 
2010 American television series debuts
2010s American crime drama television series
2010s American legal television series
2010s American mystery television series
2010s American police procedural television series
2020s American crime drama television series
2020s American legal television series
2020s American mystery television series
2020s American police procedural television series
CBS original programming
English-language television shows
Fictional portrayals of the New York City Police Department
New York Supreme Court
Television series about families
Television series about siblings
Television series by CBS Studios
Television shows featuring audio description
Television shows filmed in New York City
Television shows set in New York City
Television shows set in New York (state)
Television series about prosecutors